Littleport is a village in East Cambridgeshire, in the Isle of Ely, Cambridgeshire, England. There are two primary schools, Millfield Primary and Littleport Community, and a secondary, Littleport and East Cambridgeshire Academy. The Littleport riots of 1816 influenced the passage of the Vagrancy Act 1824.

History
With an Old English name of Litelport, the village was worth 17,000 eels a year to the Abbots of Ely in 1086.

The legendary founder of Littleport was King Canute. A fisherman gave the king shelter one night, after drunken monks had denied him hospitality. After punishing the monks, he made his host the mayor of a newly founded village.

The Littleport Riots of 1816 broke out after war veterans from the Battle of Waterloo returned home, only to find they could get no work and grain prices had gone up. They took to the streets and smashed shops and buildings until troops were brought in. St George's church registers were destroyed in the riots. The remaining registers start from 1754 (marriages), 1756 (burials), and 1783 (baptisms). Some original documents to do with the riots are held in Cambridgeshire Archives and Local Studies at the County Record Office, Cambridge.

In 2003, a Harley-Davidson statue was unveiled in Littleport to mark the centenary of the motorcycle company. William Harley, father of the company's co-founder William Sylvester Harley, was born in Victoria Street, Littleport, in 1835 and emigrated to the United States in 1859.
Google Earth view of the motorcycle statue

Governance
Littleport is a civil parish with an elected council. Parish council meetings are held in the Barn.

The second tier of local government in Littleport was Ely Rural District from 1894 to 1974, when East Cambridgeshire District Council was formed based in Ely. The third tier is Cambridgeshire County Council.

The parish belongs to the parliamentary constituency of North East Cambridgeshire.

Economy
Thomas Peacock, who founded the gentlemen's tailoring chain Hope Brothers, was born in Littleport in 1829. Peacock had several shops in London starting from one in Ludgate Hill. The first three-storey Hope Brothers shirt and collar-making factory was opened in the village in 1881 in White Hart Lane. By 1891 it was employing 300–400 women and children. It had a social club and library. For a period in the 1940s and 1950s, Hope Brothers also manufactured the England football kit. The factory was later taken over by Burberry.

From 1979 to 1983, the firm of Jim Burns guitars was based in Padnal Road in Littleport. It produced guitars such as the Steer, popularized by Billy Bragg.

Little Ouse
Littleport Parish includes the hamlet of Little Ouse which comes under the Littleport East ward. Little Ouse is now wholly residential: the pub (Waterman's Arms) and the Church of St John the Evangelist have become private dwellings.

The lowest trig point in Britain is near Little Ouse; it sits at 3 ft (1m) below sea level.

Climate

Cambridgeshire's average annual rainfall of  makes it one of Britain's driest counties. Protected from the cool onshore coastal breezes east of the region, the county is warm in summer and cold and frosty in winter.

The nearest Met Office weather station is Cambridge NIAB.

Several other local weather stations report periodic figures to the internet. For example, via Weather Underground, Inc.

Demography

The city of Ely itself has the highest East Cambridgeshire population with Soham second and Littleport third.

Notable people
Peter Ackroyd (1917–2005), Biblical scholar, died in a nursing home here.
William Harley emigrated to the United States, where his son William Sylvester Harley went into partnership to establish the Harley-Davidson Motorcycle Company
Fred Hockley (1923–1945), World War II fighter pilot
James Nightall (1922–1944), posthumously awarded the George Cross for gallantry shown in the Soham rail disaster in 1944
Marty Scurll, professional wrestler. BOLA 2016 winner and multiple times Progress Wrestling Champion
Victor Watson (born 1936), children's writer and academic, born in Littleport
Thomas Peacock (born 1829 in Littleport, died 1895) set up the Gentlemen's Tailoring chain Hope Brothers and built a shirt and collar factory in Littleport in 1881.
Roger Law (born 1941 in Littleport), is a British caricaturist, ceramist and one half of Luck and Flaw (with Peter Fluck), creators of the popular satirical TV puppet show Spitting Image.

World War II
On 16 December 1944, British double agent Eddie Chapman was flown on a mission to Britain by the Germans in a fast and manoeuvrable small fighter plane, that took off from a forward Luftwaffe fighter station on the Dutch coast. The purpose of the mission was to monitor the accuracy of V-1 flying bombs and V-2 rockets falling on London and then to report back their effect on the morale of the population in order to improve the performance and devastation of the attacks. After following the bombs to London, Chapman's fighter rerouted to East Anglia to enable him to bail out over flat ground.

The fighter had been converted for parachuting by cutting a small trap door in the floor. The low-flying fighter was picked up by a British night-fighter and attacked over the dropping zone. Chapman scrambled head first through the trap door, with his parachute initially getting stuck. Whilst floating down to the ground he witnessed the British night-fighter re-engage the German fighter, which burst into flames and exploded in a fireball as it hit the ground killing the remaining crew. Chapman landed near Apes Hall, Littleport, in the middle of the night. He woke the farm foreman George Convine by banging on the hall door. To avoid difficult questions, Corvine was told by Chapman that he was a crashed British airman and that he needed him to call the police.

Local folklore and legends

Black dog hauntings
Littleport is home to two different legends of spectral black dogs, which have been linked to the Black Shuck folklore of the East of England but differ in significant aspects.

The local folklorist W. H. Barrett tells a story set before the English Reformation, of a local girl gathering wild mint from a nearby mere, who is rescued from a lustful friar by a huge black dog, both of which are killed in the struggle. The local men throw the body of the friar into the mere, but bury with honour the dog, which is then said to haunt the area.

Cambridgeshire folklorist Enid Porter tells stories from the 19th century of a black dog haunting the A10 road between Littleport and the neighbouring hamlet of Brandon Creek. Local residents are kept awake on dark nights by the sounds of howling and travellers hear trotting feet behind them and feel hot breath on the back of their legs. Local legend says that the dog is awaiting the return of its owner, who drowned in the nearby River Great Ouse in the early 1800s. This haunting reportedly ended in 1906, when a local resident drove his car into something solid, which was never found, next to the spot where the dog's owner supposedly drowned.

Cultural reference
Littleport provided the inspiration for Great Deeping, the imaginary location of the Paradise Barn children's novels by Victor Watson, set in the Second World War.

See also
List of places in Cambridgeshire
Littleport railway station
The Boat Race: There were four unofficial boat races held during the Second World War away from London. The 1944 Race was held on the River Great Ouse between Littleport and Queen Adelaide, Cambridgeshire, near Ely. The Boat Race 2021 was held here because of the COVID-19 pandemic and safety issues with Hammersmith Bridge on the Thames.

Gallery

Notes and references

External links

The Littleport Society
Littleport Parish Council Website
Littleport and East Cambs Academy
2001 Census
GenUK's entry for Littleport
Littleport unveiling of Hope Brothers factory plaque
Littleport Life Community Magazine
Littleport Riots (Parish Council Website)
Littleport Rotary Club
Littleport Town Cricket Club
Littleport parkrun

 
Villages in Cambridgeshire
Civil parishes in Cambridgeshire
Populated places on the River Great Ouse
Reportedly haunted locations in the East of England
East Cambridgeshire District